Graptopeltus is a genus of true bugs belonging to the family Rhyparochromidae.

The species of this genus are found in Europe.

Species:
 Graptopeltus consors (Horvath, 1878) 
 Graptopeltus filicornis (Bergroth, 1894)

References

Rhyparochromidae